Bloomington is a city in Bear Lake County, Idaho, United States. The population was 206 at the 2010 census.  It was first settled in 1864.

Geography

Demographics

2010 census
As of the census of 2010, there were 206 people, 74 households, and 57 families residing in the city. The racial makeup of the city was 88.8% White, 2.9% Native American, 2.4% Asian, 4.9% from other races, and 1.0% from two or more races. Hispanic or Latino of any race were 8.3% of the population.

There were 74 households, of which 32.4% had children under the age of 18 living with them, 70.3% were married couples living together, 4.1% had a female householder with no husband present, 2.7% had a male householder with no wife present, and 23.0% were non-families. 21.6% of all households were made up of individuals, and 10.9% had someone living alone who was 65 years of age or older. The average household size was 2.78 and the average family size was 3.28.

The median age in the city was 46.5 years. 26.2% of residents were under the age of 18; 6.9% were between the ages of 18 and 24; 15.1% were from 25 to 44; 32.5% were from 45 to 64; and 19.4% were 65 years of age or older. The gender makeup of the city was 53.9% male and 46.1% female.

2000 census
As of the census of 2000, there were 251 people, 81 households, and 66 families residing in the city. The racial makeup of the city was 97.21% White and 2.79% Native American. Hispanic or Latino of any race were 2.39% of the population.

There were 81 households, out of which 39.5% had children under the age of 18 living with them, 72.8% were married couples living together, 7.4% had a female householder with no husband present, and 18.5% were non-families. 17.3% of all households were made up of individuals, and 8.6% had someone living alone who was 65 years of age or older.  The average household size was 3.10 and the average family size was 3.53.

In the city, the population was spread out, with 38.6% under the age of 18, 4.0% from 18 to 24, 22.3% from 25 to 44, 20.3% from 45 to 64, and 14.7% who were 65 years of age or older.  The median age was 34 years. For every 100 females, there were 105.7 males.  For every 100 females age 18 and over, there were 100.0 males.

The median income for a household in the city was $34,750, and the median income for a family was $40,625. Males had a median income of $33,125 versus $13,750 for females. The per capita income for the city was $13,866.  About 4.2% of families and 2.8% of the population were below the poverty line, including none of those under the age of eighteen or sixty five or over.

See also
 List of cities in Idaho

References

Cities in Bear Lake County, Idaho
Cities in Idaho
Populated places established in 1864